Henry I, Count of Sponheim (born between 1235 and 1240; died 1 August 1289) was a German nobleman of the house of Sponheim, son of John I. He was the count of Sponheim from 1266 until his death, he was succeeded by his son John II.

1230s births
1289 deaths

House of Sponheim